Franco Carlos Gamero (born 11 October 1990) is a Puerto Rican international footballer who is currently a free agent.

Raised in Kearny, New Jersey, Gamero played prep soccer at Kearny High School.

Career
Gamero has played for NJIT Highlanders.

He made his senior international debut for Puerto Rico in 2012.

References

1990 births
Living people
Kearny High School (New Jersey) alumni
Puerto Rican footballers
Puerto Rico international footballers
NJ-LUSO Parma players
Association football forwards
Soccer players from New Jersey
USL League Two players
People from Kearny, New Jersey
Sportspeople from Hudson County, New Jersey